A Heelhook can be

 a special leg lock using a foot in grappling
 a climbing technique, where the heel is hooked on a hold